Hoài Đức may refer to several places in Vietnam:

 Hoài Đức District, a rural district of Hanoi
 Hoài Đức, Bình Định, a rural commune of Hoài Nhơn District
 Hoài Đức, Lâm Đồng, a rural commune of Lâm Hà District